Friedrieke Wenisch-Filz (27 August 1907 – 22 July 1981) was an Austrian fencer. She competed in the women's individual foil event at the 1936, 1948 and 1952 Summer Olympics.

References

1907 births
1981 deaths
Austrian female foil fencers
Olympic fencers of Austria
Fencers at the 1936 Summer Olympics
Fencers at the 1948 Summer Olympics
Fencers at the 1952 Summer Olympics